Dissanayake or Dissanayaka is a Sinhalese surname. It means area leader. Notable people with the surname include:

 Anura Kumara Dissanayaka (born 1968), Sri Lankan politician
 Berty Premalal Dissanayake (1954–2013), Sri Lankan politician
 Cyril Dissanayake, Sri Lankan police officer
 Duminda Dissanayake (born 1979), Sri Lankan politician
 Ellen Dissanayake, American anthropologist
 Gamini Dissanayake (1942–1994), Sri Lankan politician
 Jayani Dissanayake, Sri Lankan politician
 Jayasena Dissanayake, Sri Lankan politician
 Kolitha Dissanayake, Sri Lankan cricketer
 Lalith Dissanayake, Sri Lankan politician
 Manjula Dissanayake (born 1967), Sri Lankan politician
 Mayantha Dissanayake (born 1980), Sri Lankan politician
 Navin Dissanayake (born 1969), Sri Lankan politician
 P. Weerakumara Dissanayake, Sri Lankan politician
 Rohana Dissanayake, Sri Lankan politician
 Ruchira Dissanayake (born 1998), Sri Lankan actor and singer
 S. A. Dissanayake (1913–1982), Sri Lankan police officer
 S. B. Dissanayake (born 1951), Sri Lankan politician
 Salinda Dissanayake (born 1958), Sri Lankan politician
 Sarath Dissanayake (born 1961), Sri Lankan Navy officer
 Somaratne Dissanayake, Sri Lankan film director, screenwriter and producer
 Sriyantha Dissanayake (born 1969), Sri Lankan sprinter
 T. B. Dissanayake, Sri Lankan lawyer
 T. D. S. A. Dissanayake, Sri Lankan diplomat and writer
 W. M. P. B. Dissanayake (1927–2003), Sri Lankan politician

See also
 
 

Surnames of Sri Lankan origin
Sinhalese surnames